The ideogrammic method was a technique expounded by Ezra Pound which allowed poetry to deal with abstract content through concrete images.  The idea was based on Pound's reading of the work of Ernest Fenollosa, especially
The Chinese Written Character as a Medium for Poetry, composed by Fenollosa but edited  by Pound after the author's death, 1908.

Pound gives a brief account of it in his book The ABC of Reading (1934).  He explains his understanding of the way Chinese characters were formed, with the example of the character 'East' (東) being essentially a superposition of the characters for 'tree' (木) and 'sun' (日); that is, a picture of the sun tangled in a tree's branches, suggesting a sunrise (which occurs in the East).  He then suggests how, with such a system where concepts are built up from concrete instances, the (abstract) concept of 'red' might be presented by putting together the (concrete) pictures of:

This was a key idea in the development of Imagism.

References and further reading

See also
 Ideogram
 Imagism

References 

Poetics
Ezra Pound
Imagism